The Cordillera Occidental is the lowest in elevation of the three branches of the Colombian Andes. The range extends from south to north dividing from the Colombian Massif in Nariño Department, passes north through Cauca, Valle del Cauca, Risaralda, Chocó, and Caldas Departments to the Paramillo Massif in Antioquia and Córdoba Departments. From this massif the range divides further to form the Serranías de Ayapel, San Jerónimo and Abibe. Only to recede into the Caribbean plain and the Sinú River valley.

Geography
The western part of the mountain range belongs to the Pacific region of Colombia, with the San Juan River being the main watershed, while the eastern part belongs to the Cauca River basin. The northern and northwestern parts belong to the Atlantic Slope, with the Atrato and Sinú Rivers being the main watersheds. The Cordillera Occidental is separated from the coastal Baudó Mountains by the Atrato River.

A number of ecoregions cover the cordillera. The Chocó–Darién moist forests cover the western foothills below 1000 meters elevation. The Northwestern Andean montane forests cover the humid western slopes of the range. The Cauca Valley montane forests cover the eastern slopes. Northern Andean páramo covers the highest elevations.

Highest peaks 
 Cerro Tatamá –  – Chocó & Risaralda
 Azufral –  – Nariño
 Farallones de Cali –  – Valle del Cauca
 Farallones del Citará –  – Antioquia
 Páramo de Frontino –  – Antioquia
 Cerro Caramanta –  – Antioquia, Caldas & Risaralda
 Cerro Napi –  – Cauca
 Alto Musinga –  – Antioquia
 Cerro Calima –  – Valle del Cauca
 Cerro Paramillo –  – Antioquia
 Cerro Ventana –  – Valle del Cauca & Chocó

Protected areas
The West Andes have the following nationally protected areas from south to north:
  PNN Munchique
  PNN Farallones de Cali
 PNN Tatamá
 PNN Las Orquídeas
 PNN Paramillo

Other areas under consideration for national protection include:
 Serranía del Pinche
 Serranía de los Paraguas

Locally protected areas
 Yotoco Forest Reserve
 Bitaco River Forest Reserve

Recreation areas
 Dapa
 Calima Lake

See also 
 Geography of Colombia
 Andean Region, Colombia
 Cordillera Central (Colombia)
 Cordillera Oriental (Colombia)

References

Mountain ranges of the Andes
Occidental